Pecatonica is a village in Winnebago County, Illinois, United States. It is part of the Rockford, Illinois Metropolitan Statistical Area. The population was 2,195 at the 2010 census, up from 1,997 in 2000.

History 

The village was named after the Pecatonica River, which forms its northern border. The word Pecatonica is an anglicization of two Algonquian language words; Bekaa (or Pekaa in certain dialects), which means slow and niba, which means water; forming the conjunction Bekaaniba or Slow Water. Civil War records from the state of Illinois include soldiers from Lysander, the area's common name before incorporation by rail speculators.  

The Galena and Chicago Union Railroad, later the Chicago & North Western Railroad, came through in 1853 from Chicago and continued to Freeport, Illinois. That sparked the town to be the center of commerce for western Winnebago County. The Village of Pecatonica was incorporated in 1869, built on territory rightfully owned by Indians and previously deeded to the Reed family by US President James K. Polk. C.W. Knowlton opened his first bank here in 1882 and built a Queen Anne Victorian house on Main Street, on the hill overlooking the business district. This house still stands, after having been restored starting in the mid-1980's.

An electric interurban line known as the Rockford & Interurban ran from Rockford through Winnebago, Illinois and Pecatonica to Ridott, Illinois and on to Freeport, starting in 1902, until the line's eventual abandonment in 1930. A small depot building remains standing near the 300 block of Main Street. For the portion of the rail line between Pecatonica and Winnebago, the line often parallels the Pecatonica River. 

This route has since been reclaimed as a nature trail known as the Prairie Path, called in 2021 the Pecatonica Prairie Trail, for walking and biking (non-motorized), with maps shown online. The village of Winnebago has also published a brochure of the trail which can be viewed online.

Prior to rail traffic, this region of Northern Illinois received stagecoach traffic. A limestone house on Comly Road dates to this period, and there are permanent wagon wheel scars near a utility building for the 12 Mile Grove Cemetery, which is just hundreds of feet from the current corridor used by U.S. Route 20, a major east-west route through Northern Illinois. Further west, Route 20 parallels more roads which sometime bear the phrase "Stagecoach Trail".

Geography

Pecatonica is located at  (42.309955, −89.358647).

Education
Education in Pecatonica is provided by the Pecatonica Community Unit School District #321, which operates three school buildings.  The Elementary School, originally constructed in 1938, was used as a high school for many years. Two additions to that structure were built in 1962 and 1970 respectively.  The Middle School, also a former high school building, was built in 1958 and also accommodated two additions to the original structure in 1967 and 1970.  

The current high school building opened in 2003.  This state-of-the-art facility is approximately 107,000 square feet.  Along with the new high school building a football field and eight lane track were constructed. The high school complex also includes a baseball diamond and play field space for physical education classes. The building was built as a flexible multi-purpose facility that will allow for both school-based and community-based activities.

Parks and recreation

North of downtown Pecatonica, on West 1st Street is Sumner Park, which has three baseball diamonds, four tennis courts, two basketball courts, horseshoe pits and children's playgrounds. The park connects with the recently acquired Pecatonica Wetlands Forest Preserve, both to the west and across the river to the north. Pecatonica Wetlands is made up of 1048 acres of flood plain forest, oxbow pond marshes and upland forest along the Pecatonica River. The site features spring flora and birdlife. Site development is still in progress but when complete will include fishing access, hiking and equestrian trails, picnic areas and wildlife areas. 

The Seward Bluffs Forest Preserve is also located nearby. The combined Public Parks and the Recreation Bike and Prairie Path offer a wide variety of recreation. It is a favored fishing spot along the Pecatonica River.

Pecatonica is also home of J&J Tumbling and Trampoline, which has produced several world class athletes, including 1988 Woman's Tumbling World Champion Megan Cunningham Gearhart (later a coach) and National Trampoline Team member Michael Devine.

Winnebago County Fair Grounds
The fairgrounds have over 108 acres of indoor and outdoor activities including music festivals, motor sports, auto and trade shows, conventions, antique markets, social events, and the Winnebago County Fair.

Demographics

As of the census of 2000, there were 1,997 people, 791 households, and 579 families residing in the village. The racial makeup of the village was 98.35% White, 0.25% African American, 0.15% Native American, 0.10% Asian, 0.25% from other races, and 0.90% from two or more races. Hispanic or Latino of any race were 0.60% of the population.

There were 791 households, out of which 38.8% had children under the age of 18 living with them, 60.7% were married couples living together, 8.8% had a female householder with no husband present, and 26.7% were non-families. 23.4% of all households were made up of individuals, and 11.9% had someone living alone who was 65 years of age or older. The average household size was 2.52 and the average family size was 2.97.

In the village, the population was spread out, with 27.2% under the age of 18, 6.1% from 18 to 24, 30.8% from 25 to 44, 21.0% from 45 to 64, and 14.9% who were 65 years of age or older. The median age was 37 years. For every 100 females, there were 91.5 males. For every 100 females age 18 and over, there were 89.9 males.

The median income for a household in the village was $47,361, and the median income for a family was $55,086. Males had a median income of $40,900 versus $27,143 for females. The per capita income for the village was $20,420. About 3.6% of families and 4.7% of the population were below the poverty line, including 5.7% of those under age 18 and 8.2% of those age 65 or over.

See also
William H. Roberts House
Trisha Paytas

References

External links
Pecatonica site

Villages in Illinois
Villages in Winnebago County, Illinois
Rockford metropolitan area, Illinois
1869 establishments in Illinois
Populated places established in 1869